Žarnov is a village and municipality in Košice-okolie District in the Kosice Region of eastern Slovakia.

History
In historical records the village was first mentioned in 1332.

Geography
The village lies at an altitude of 205 metres and covers an area of 7.197 km².
It has a population of about 420 people.

Ethnicity
The population is almost entirely Hungarian in ethnicity.

Government

The municipal seat of the tax office and district office is located at Moldava nad Bodvou and the seat of the police force is at Turňa nad Bodvou.

Culture
The village has a public library and a number of food stores.

Sport
The village has a football pitch.

Transport
The nearest railway station is at Turňa nad Bodvou.

External links
http://www.statistics.sk/mosmis/eng/run.html

Zarnov